"Move On" (working titles: "Yippee Yay", "Big John", "Joanne", "Love for Me Is Love Forever") is a waltz song recorded by the Swedish music group ABBA for their 1977 release, ABBA: The Album. The lead vocals were performed by Björn Ulvaeus in the spoken first verse and by Agnetha Fältskog in the second and third verses.

The Spanish version of "Move On", "Al Andar" (or "El Andar"), was recorded in January 1980 for ABBA's Spanish language album Gracias Por La Música with Spanish lyrics by Buddy and Mary McCluskey.

Cover versions
 In 1982, Colgate-Palmolive used a cover by an uncredited artist for a TV commercial in Germany to promote the Gard shampoo brand.
 A cover by heavy metal artist Rob Rock is included on his 2005 album Holy Hell with additional vocals by power metal singer Tobias Sammet, lead singer of the German band Edguy.

References

External links 
 abba-world.net

ABBA songs
1970s ballads
1977 songs
Pop ballads